Moncheux is a commune in the Moselle department in Grand Est in north-eastern France. It is 35km north of Nancy and about 50km south west from the border with Germany.

See also
 Communes of the Moselle department

References

External links
 

Communes of Moselle (department)